Lost Treasure may refer to:

 Lost treasure, a list of missing treasures
 Lost Treasure (board game), 1982
 The Lost Treasure, a 1996 Croatian film
 Lost Treasure (film), a 2003 American film
 Lost Treasure (magazine), an American monthly about missing treasures

See also